Pseudhapigia is a monotypic moth genus of the family Notodontidae (the prominents). Its only species, Pseudhapigia brunnea, is found in North America including its type location in Guadalajara, Mexico. The genus and species were first described by William Schaus in 1901.

The MONA or Hodges number for Pseudhapigia brunnea is 8029.

References

Further reading

 
 
 
 
 
 
 
 
 

Notodontidae
Articles created by Qbugbot
Moths described in 1901
Monotypic moth genera